Warriors Mark is an unincorporated community in Huntingdon County, Pennsylvania, United States. Warriors Mark has a post office, with ZIP code 16877.

References

Unincorporated communities in Huntingdon County, Pennsylvania
Unincorporated communities in Pennsylvania